1977 National Football League (South Africa)

Final table

NB: 3 more losses than wins; odd number of draws; 9 more goals conceded than scored.

See also
 National Football League (South Africa)

References

External links
  South Africa League 1977 www.rsssf.com
   expro.co.za

Nat
National Football League (South Africa), 1977-78
National Football League (South Africa), 1977-78
South Africa